Zgornje Verjane is a settlement in the Municipality of Sveta Trojica v Slovenskih Goricah in the Slovene Hills, northeastern Slovenia. The area is part of the traditional region of Styria and is now included in the Drava Statistical Region.

A small chapel with a belfry in the settlement was built in 1870.

References

External links
Zgornje Verjane at Geopedia

Populated places in the Municipality of Sveta Trojica v Slovenskih Goricah